Dahar (also, Daxar and Dakhar) is a village in the Ismailli Rayon of Azerbaijan.  The village forms part of the municipality of Cülyan. According to Azerbaijan's State Statistics Committee, only five people lived in the village as of 2014.

References 

Populated places in Ismayilli District